The 2017 Rolex Paris Masters was a professional men's tennis tournament played on indoor hard courts. It was the 45th edition of the tournament, and part of the World Tour Masters 1000 category of the 2017 ATP World Tour. It took place at the Palais omnisports de Paris-Bercy in Paris, France, between 30 October and 5 November 2017. The event was the final professional tennis tournament for French player Paul-Henri Mathieu, who received wildcards into the singles qualifying and doubles draws.

Points and prize money

Point distribution

Prize money

Singles main-draw entrants

Seeds
The following are the seeded players. Seedings are based on ATP rankings as of 23 October 2017. Rankings and points before are as of 30 October 2017. Points defending include points from the 2016 ATP World Tour Finals, which will be dropped at the end of the tournament.

Other entrants
The following players received wildcards into the singles main draw:
  Julien Benneteau
  Pierre-Hugues Herbert
  Nicolas Mahut

The following players received entry from the qualifying draw:
  Jérémy Chardy
  Borna Ćorić
  Filip Krajinović
  Vasek Pospisil
  João Sousa
  Jan-Lennard Struff

The following players received entry as a lucky loser:
  Evgeny Donskoy
  Peter Gojowczyk

Withdrawals
Before the tournament
  Tomáš Berdych →replaced by  Kyle Edmund
  Novak Djokovic →replaced by  Robin Haase
  Roger Federer →replaced by  Evgeny Donskoy
  Fabio Fognini →replaced by  Viktor Troicki
  Philipp Kohlschreiber →replaced by  Ryan Harrison
  Nick Kyrgios →replaced by  Chung Hyeon
  Gaël Monfils →replaced by  Peter Gojowczyk
  Gilles Müller →replaced by  Yūichi Sugita
  Andy Murray →replaced by  Gilles Simon
  Kei Nishikori →replaced by  Benoît Paire
  Milos Raonic →replaced by  Steve Johnson
  Stan Wawrinka →replaced by  Fernando Verdasco

Doubles main-draw entrants

Seeds

 1 Rankings are as of 23 October 2017

Other entrants
The following pairs received wildcards into the doubles main draw:
   Julien Benneteau /  Édouard Roger-Vasselin
   Paul-Henri Mathieu /  Benoît Paire

Finals

Singles

  Jack Sock defeated  Filip Krajinović, 5–7, 6–4, 6–1

Doubles

   Łukasz Kubot /  Marcelo Melo defeated  Ivan Dodig /  Marcel Granollers, 7–6(7–3), 3–6, [10–6]

References

External links
 Official website
 ATP tournament profile